Diego Gabriel Rivarola Popón (born July 14, 1976) is a Chilean-Argentine former professional footballer who played as striker.

Career
Rivarola was born in Mendoza, Argentina. As a child, he was with Club Leonardo Murialdo in Mendoza, next he was formed in the lower River Plate, but did not debut with the first team. Later he moved to Platense, where he played eight games.

In 1997, he was hired by Santiago Morning, of Chile until 2000 when he would join Universidad de Chile. His first stint with the Santiago-based club would last five years (interrupted by a brief stay at Mexican Atlas in 2002), during which he became one of the most liked players of the team, due in part to his performances at the derbies against Colo-Colo. With Universidad de Chile, Rivarola would win the Chilean National Championship in 2000 and Apertura Tournament in 2004.

At the beginning of 2006, and after conflicts with then coach of the Universidad de Chile, Héctor Pinto, Rivarola signed with Argentinos Juniors, but failed to establish himself as part of the team's starting 11 and moved to the Venezuelan club UA Maracaibo few months later.

In mid-2007 and for Torneo de Clausura, he signed with Palestino of Chile, led by his former Universidad de Chile teammate, Luis Musrri.

After playing for Santiago Morning, Rivarola moved back to Universidad de Chile, eventually appearing in the 2010 Copa Libertadores. On 2011 he won the Apertura Tournament with La "U" after six years from his last championship.

On August 28, 2011 he scored his 100th goal with Universidad de Chile in a match against Universidad de Concepción for the Clausura Tournament.

Post retirement
From 2012 to 2022, Rivarola worked as an ambassador of Universidad de Chile, at the same time he was in charge of the both business and marketing areas. In February 2022, he joined ESPN Chile, along with the former footballer Jean Beausejour, as a football commentator and analyst.

Career statistics

Honours
Universidad de Chile
 Primera División de Chile: 2000, 2004 Apertura, 2011 Apertura, 2011 Clausura
 Copa Chile: 2000
 Copa Sudamericana: 2011

References

External links
 Argentine Primera statistics

1976 births
Living people
Sportspeople from Mendoza, Argentina
Argentine emigrants to Chile
Argentine footballers
Argentine expatriate footballers
Club Atlético River Plate footballers
Club Atlético Platense footballers
Santiago Morning footballers
Universidad de Chile footballers
Argentinos Juniors footballers
Atlas F.C. footballers
UA Maracaibo players
Club Deportivo Palestino footballers
Alki Larnaca FC players
Argentine Primera División players
Chilean Primera División players
Liga MX players
Venezuelan Primera División players
Cypriot First Division players
Naturalized citizens of Chile
Expatriate footballers in Chile
Argentine expatriate sportspeople in Chile
Expatriate footballers in Mexico
Argentine expatriate sportspeople in Mexico
Expatriate footballers in Venezuela
Argentine expatriate sportspeople in Venezuela
Expatriate footballers in Cyprus
Argentine expatriate sportspeople in Cyprus
Association football forwards
Chilean association football commentators